The 2009 Open de Moselle was a men's tennis tournament played on indoor hard courts. It was the seventh edition of the Open de Moselle, and was part of the ATP World Tour 250 Series of the 2009 ATP World Tour. It was held at the Arènes de Metz in Metz, France, from 21 September through 27 September 2009. First-seeded Gaël Monfils won the singles title.

Entrants

Seeds

 Seeds are based on the rankings of September 14, 2009

Other entrants

The following players received wildcards into the singles main draw

  Josselin Ouanna
  Sébastien Grosjean
  Michaël Llodra

The following players received entry from the qualifying draw:

  Thierry Ascione
  Michael Berrer
  Sébastien de Chaunac
  Roman Valent

Finals

Singles

 Gaël Monfils defeated  Philipp Kohlschreiber, 7–6(7–1), 3–6, 6–2
 It was Monfils' first title of the year and second of his career.

Doubles

 Colin Fleming /  Ken Skupski defeated  Arnaud Clément /  Michaël Llodra, 2–6, 6–4, [10–5]

References

External links
 Official website

 
2009 ATP World Tour
2009 in French tennis